Deltona High School is a public high school located in Deltona, Florida, United States. It is located on Wolf Pack Run, east of Interstate 4 in the city's northwestern corner. In the 2011–2012 academic school year, the school enrolled 1,666 students in grades 9–12. Deltona High opened on August 29, 1988 as the city's first high school. The school was the first high school in Volusia County to be built since Spruce Creek High School in 1975. The School's main "rival", Pine Ridge High School, comes just down Howland Boulevard.

Notable alumni
 Chad Brown (born 1996), basketball player in the Israeli Basketball Premier League
Luke Delaney, retired mayor in the United States Marine Corps, selected for astronaut candidate in NASA Astronaut Group 23
Montana DuRapau, MLB baseball player
Jack López, MLB baseball player

References

External links 
Deltona High School

High schools in Volusia County, Florida
Educational institutions established in 1988
Public high schools in Florida
Deltona, Florida
1988 establishments in Florida